Ceridwen Dovey (born 1980) is a South African and Australian social anthropologist and author. In 2009 she was named a 5 under 35 nominee by the National Book Foundation and in 2020 won The Bragg UNSW Press Prize for Science Writing.

Early years and education
Dovey was born in Pietermaritzburg, South Africa, and grew up between South Africa and Australia. Her parents derived her name from one of the protagonists in Richard Llewellyn's 1939 novel set in Wales, How Green Was My Valley. Dovey attended high school in Australia at North Sydney Girls High School, before going to the United States in 1999 to study at Harvard University as an undergraduate where she completed a joint degree in Anthropology and Visual & Environmental Studies in 2003. During her time at Harvard, Dovey made documentaries that highlighted the relationships between farmers and rural labourers in post-apartheid South Africa. She made a documentary about wine farm labour relations in the Western Cape of South Africa, Aftertaste, as part of her honors thesis.

Career
In 2004 Dovey worked briefly for the television programme NOW with Bill Moyers at Channel Thirteen in New York City before moving to South Africa to study creative writing at the University of Cape Town. She wrote her first novel Blood Kin as her thesis for an MA in creative writing under the supervision of poet Stephen Watson, then did her graduate studies in Social Anthropology at New York University. She moved back to Sydney, Australia in 2010. From 2010 to 2015 she worked for the Institute for Sustainable Futures at the University of Technology Sydney. She writes non-fiction for various publications, including newyorker.com and The Monthly.

Works
Dovey's first novel, Blood Kin was published by Atlantic Books (U.K.), Penguin (South Africa) and Penguin (Australia) in July 2007, and by Viking in North America in March 2008. It was published in fifteen countries, including Germany, France, Italy, the Netherlands, and Sweden. It was shortlisted in 2007 for the Dylan Thomas Prize and the U.K.'s John Llewellyn Rhys Prize for British/Commonwealth authors under the age of 35 and was shortlisted in 2008 for the Commonwealth Writers' Prize for Best First Book (Africa). It tells the story of a fictional military coup from the perspective of the overthrown leader's portraitist, chef, and barber. The novel is deliberately ambiguous in its setting.

Dovey's second book, Only the Animals is a collection of ten short stories about the souls of ten animals caught up in human conflicts over the last century. It won the inaugural 2014 Readings New Australian Writing Award and the People's Choice for Fiction Award (joint with Joan London's The Golden Age) at the NSW Premier's Literary Awards, as well as the Queensland Literary Awards Steele Rudd Award for a short story collection.

Dovey's third novel, In the Garden of the Fugitives, was published in early 2018.

Writers on Writers: Ceridwen Dovey on J.M. Coetzee was published in October 2018 as part of Black Inc.'s Writers on Writers series.

Life After Truth is Dovey's fourth novel and was published in November 2020.

Personal life
She lives in Sydney, Australia, with her husband, Blake Munting, and two children. Her parents live in Sydney and her sister, Lindiwe Dovey, is a senior lecturer in African Screen Media at SOAS in London.

Bibliography

Books

Critical studies and reviews of Dovey's work
Life after truth

Awards and recognition
Dovey was a recipient of a Sidney Myer Creative Fellowship, an award of  given to mid-career creatives and thought leaders.
2009: Named a 5 under 35 nominee by the National Book Foundation
2020: Winner, Bragg UNSW Press Prize for Science Writing, for her article, "True Grit", published in Wired
2020: Winner, Finkel Foundation Eureka Prize for Long-Form Science Journalism

References

External links
 The Ceridwen Dovey official shelf page on Book Southern Africa
 Ceridwen Dovey's website
 "Q & A with Ceridwen Dovey", Penguin Books Australia. 2014

1980 births
21st-century Australian novelists
Australian women novelists
South African women novelists
South African novelists
Living people
Harvard College alumni
University of Cape Town alumni
People educated at North Sydney Girls High School
21st-century Australian women writers